The Homeland School is a historic school in Homeland, Florida. It is located at 249 Church Avenue, inside Homeland Heritage Park. On February 2, 2007, it was added to the U.S. National Register of Historic Places.

References

National Register of Historic Places in Polk County, Florida
Defunct schools in Florida